The Kikuyu (also Agĩkũyũ/Gĩkũyũ) are a Bantu ethnic group native to Central Kenya.  At a population of 8,148,668 as of 2019, they account for 17.13% of the total population of Kenya, making them Kenya's largest ethnic group.

The term Kikuyu is derived from the Swahili form of the word Gĩkũyũ.  is derived from the word mũkũyũ which means sycamore fig (mũkũyũ) tree". Hence Agĩkũyũ in the Kikuyu language translates to "Children Of The Big Sycamore". The alternative name Nyũmba ya Mũmbi, which encompasses Embu, Gikuyu, and Meru, translates to "House of the Potter" (or "Creator").

History

Origin
The Kikuyu belong to the Northeastern Bantu branch. Their language is most closely related to that of the Embu and Mbeere. Geographically, they are concentrated in the vicinity of Mount Kenya.

The exact place that the Northeast Bantu speakers migrated from after the initial Bantu expansion is uncertain. Some authorities suggest that the Kikuyu arrived in their present Mount Kenya area of habitation from earlier settlements further to the north and east, while others argue that the Kikuyu, along with their closely related Eastern Bantu neighbours the Embu, Meru, Mbeere, and Kamba moved into Kenya from points further north.

From archaeological evidence, their arrival at the northern side of Mt. Kenya dates to around the 3rd century, as part of the larger group known as Thagicu. By the 6th century, there was a community of Agikuyu newly established at Gatung'ang'a in Nyeri. The Agikuyu established themselves in their current homeland of Mt. Kenya region by the 13th century.

Before 1888

The nation and its pursuits
Before the establishment of East Africa Protectorate in 1895, the Agĩkũyũ preserved geographic and political power from almost all external influence for many generations; they had never been subdued. Before the arrival of the British, Arabs involved in slave trading and their caravans passed at the southern edges of the Agĩkũyũ nation. Slavery as an institution did not exist amongst the Agĩkũyũ, nor did they make raids for the capture of slaves. The Arabs who tried to venture into Agĩkũyũ land met instant death. Relying on a combination of land purchases, blood-brotherhood (partnerships), intermarriage with other people, and their adoption and absorption, the Agĩkũyũ were in a constant state of territorial expansion. Economically, the Agĩkũyũ were great farmers and shrewd businesspeople. Besides farming and business, the Agĩkũyũ were involved in small scale industries with professions such as bridge building, string making, wire drawing, and iron chain making. The Agĩkũyũ had a great sense of justice (kĩhooto).

Social and political life
The Agĩkũyũ nation was divided into nine clans. Each clan traced its lineage to a single female ancestor and a daughter of Mumbi. The clans were not restricted to any particular geographical area, they lived side by side. Some clans had a recognised leader, others did not. However, in either case, real political power was exercised by the ruling council of elders for each clan. Each clan then forwarded the leader of its council to the apex council of elders for the whole community. The overall council of elders representing all the clans was then led by a headman or the nation's spokesman.

Spirituality and religion

Ngai – The Supreme Creator
The Gĩkũyũ were – and still are – monotheists believing in an omnipotent Creator whom they refer to as Ngai. All of the Gĩkũyũ, Embu, and Kamba use this name. Ngai was also known as Mũrungu by the Meru and Embu tribes, or Mũlungu (a variant of a word referring to the Creator). The title Mwathani or Mwathi (the greatest ruler) comes from the word gwatha meaning to rule or reign with authority, was and is still used. All sacrifices to Ngai were performed under a sycamore tree (Mũkũyũ) and if one was not available, a fig tree (Mũgumo) would be used. The olive tree (Mũtamaiyũ) was a sacred tree for women.

Mount Kenya and religion
Ngai or Mwene-Nyaga is the Supreme Creator and giver of all things. He created the first Gĩkũyũ communities, and provided them with all the resources necessary for life: land, rain, plants, and animals. Ngai cannot be seen but is manifested in the sun, moon, stars, comets and meteors, thunder and lightning, rain, rainbows, and in the great fig trees (Mugumo). These trees served as places of worship and sacrifice and marked the spot at Mũkũrũe wa Gathanga where Gĩkũyũ and Mũmbi – the ancestors of the Gĩkũyũ in the oral legend – first settled. Ngai has human characteristics, and although some say that he lives in the sky or in the clouds, Gĩkũyũ lore also says that Ngai comes to earth from time to time to inspect it, bestow blessings, and mete out punishment. When he comes, Ngai rests on Mount Kenya (Kīrīnyaga) and Kilimambogo (kĩrĩma kĩa njahĩ). Thunder is interpreted to be the movement of Ngai and lightning is the weapon used by Ngai to clear the way when moving from one sacred place to another. Some people believe that Ngai's abode is on Mount Kenya. In one legend Ngai made the mountain his resting place while on an inspection tour of earth. Ngai then took the first man, Gikuyu, to the top to point out the beauty of the land he was giving him.

Philosophy of the Traditional Kikuyu Religion
The cardinal points in this Traditional Gĩkũyũ Religion Philosophy were squarely based on the general Bantu peoples thought as follows:
The universe is composed of interacting and interconnected forces whose manifestation is the physical things we see, including ourselves and those we don't see.
All those forces (things) in the universe came from God who, from the beginning of time, have had the vital divine force of creation within himself.
Everything created by God retains a bond from God (Creator) to the created.
The first humans who were created by God have the strongest vital force because they got it directly from God.
Because these first humans sit just below God in power, they are almost like Gods or even can be Gods.
The current parent of an individual is the link to God through the immediate dead and through ancestors.
On Earth, humans have the highest quantity of vital force.
All the other things (forces) on Earth were created to enable human vital force (being) become stronger.
All things have vital force but some objects, plants and animals have higher vital force than others.
A human can use an animal to symbolize the level of his vital force compared to other humans.
There is a specific point within every physical manifestation (thing) of vital force where most of that force is concentrated.
A human can easily manipulate things to his advantage or to their detriment by identifying this point of concentration of vital force. There are human beings who have more knowledge of these forces and can manipulate them at will usually by invoking higher forces to assist.
Higher forces are invoked by humans using lower forces (animal or plant sacrifice) as intermediaries. To approach higher forces directly is thahu (abomination which leads to a curse).
The human society has some few elite people very skilled in the art of manipulating forces to strengthen a human(s) force or diminish it, strengthen any force below human force or diminish it.
The leader of a human society is the one possessing the highest vital force as at that time or the one closest to God or both. Since the leader of this human society has the highest vital force and hence closer to God than any other person, he should be able to nourish the rest of the people by linking them to the ultimate God and by being able to command lower forces to act in such a way so as to reinforce the other humans' vital force.
The life force of a dead ancestor can come back to life through the act of birth of a new child, especially when the child is named after the departed ancestor and all is seen to be well.

The Gĩkũyũ held a belief in the interconnection of everything in the universe. To the Gĩkũyũ people, everything we see has an inner spiritual force and the most sacred though unspoken ontology was being is force. This spiritual vital force originated from God, who had the power to create or destroy that life force. To the Gĩkũyũ people, God was the supreme being in the universe and the giver (Mũgai/Ngai) of this life force to everything that exists. Gĩkũyũ people also believed that everything God created had a vital inner force and a connection bond to Him by the mere fact that he created that thing and gave it that inner force that makes it be and be manifested physically. To the Agĩkũyũ, God had this life force within himself hence He was the ultimate owner and ruler of everything in the universe. The latter was the ultimate conception of God among the Gĩkũyũ people hence the name Mũgai/Ngai. To the Gĩkũyũ people, those who possessed the greatest life force, those closest to God were the first parents created by God because God directly gave them the vital living force. These first parents were so respected to be treated almost like God himself. These were followed by the ancestors of the people who inherited life force from the first parents, then followed by the immediate dead and finally the eldest in the community. Hence when people wanted to offer sacrifices, the eldest in the community would perform the rites. Children in the community had a link to God through their parents and that chain would move upwards to parent parents, ancestors, first created parents until it reaches God Himself. The Gĩkũyũ people believed the departed spirits of the ancestors can be reborn again in this world when children are being born, hence the rites performed during the child naming ceremonies. The Gĩkũyũ people believed the vital life force or soul of a person can be increased or diminished, thereby affecting the person's health. They also believed that some people possessed power to manipulate the inner force in all things. These people who increased the well being of a person spirit were called medicine-men (Mũgo) while those who diminished the person's life force were called witchdoctors (Mũrogi). They also believed that ordinary items can have their spiritual powers increased such that they protect a person against those bent on diminishing a person vital life force. Such an item with such powers was called gĩthitũ. Thus, the philosophy of the Gĩkũyũ religion and life, in general, was anchored on the understanding that everything in the universe has an inner interlinked force that we do not see. God among the Gĩkũyũ people was understood hence to be the owner and distributor (Mũgai) of this inner life force in all things and He was worshiped and praised to either increase the life force of all things (farm produce, cattle, children) the Gĩkũyũ people possessed and minimize events that led to catastrophes that would diminish the life force of the people or lead to death. The leader of the Gĩkũyũ people was the person who was thought to possess the greatest life force among the people or the person who had demonstrated the greatest life force in taking care of the people, their families, their farm produce, their cattle and their land. This person was hence thought to be closer to God than anybody else living in that nation. The said person also had to demonstrate and practice the highest levels of truth (maa) and justice (kihooto), just like the supreme God of the Gĩkũyũ people would do.

Political structures and generational change

The Agĩkũyũ had four seasons and two harvests in one year.
 Mbura ya njahĩ (the season of big rain) from March to July;
 Magetha ma njahĩ (njahĩ being Lablab purpureus) (the season of the black bean harvest) between July and early October;
 Mbura ya Mwere (short rain season) from October to January;
 Magetha ma Mwere (the season of harvesting) milletà;
 Mbura ya Kĩmera.

Further, time was recorded through the initiation by circumcision. Each initiation group was given a special name. According to Professor Godfrey Mũriũki, the individual initiation sets are then grouped into a regiment every nine calendar years. Before a regiment or army was set, there was a period in which no initiation of boys took place. This period lasted a total of four and a half calendar years (nine seasons in Gĩkũyũ land, each season referred to as imera) and is referred to as mũhingo, with initiation taking place at the start of the fifth year and going on annually for the next nine calendar years. This was the system adopted in Metumi Murang'a. The regiment or army sets also get special names, some of which seem to have ended up as popular male names. In Gaki Nyeri the system was inversed with initiation taking place annually for four calendar years, which would be followed by a period of nine calendar years in which no initiation of boys took place (mũhingo). Girls, on the other hand, were initiated every year. Several regiments then make up a ruling generation. It was estimated that ruling generations lasted an average of 35 years. The names of the initiation and regiment sets vary within Gĩkũyũ land. The ruling generations are however uniform and provide very important chronological data. On top of that, the initiation sets were a way of documenting events within the Gĩkũyũ nation, so, for example, were the occurrence of smallpox and syphilis recorded. Girls' initiation sets were also accorded special names, although there has been little research in this area. Mũriũki only unearths three sets, whose names are, Rũharo [1894], Kibiri/Ndũrĩrĩ [1895], Kagica [1896], Ndutu/Nuthi [1897]. All these names are taken from Metumi (Mũrang'a) and Kabete Kĩambu.

 Manjiri 1512 – 1546 ± 55
 Mamba 1547 – 1581 ± 50
 Tene 1582 – 1616 ± 45
 Aagu 1617 – 1651 ± 40
 Manduti 1652 – 1686 ± 40
 Cuma 1687 – 1721 ± 30
 Ciira 1722 – 1756 ± 25
 Mathathi 1757 – 1791 ± 20
 Ndemi 1792 – 1826 ± 15
 Iregi 1827 – 1861 ± 10
 Maina 1862 – 1897 ± 5
 Mwangi 1898?

Mathew Njoroge Kabetũ's list reads, Tene, Kĩyĩ, Aagu, Ciĩra, Mathathi, Ndemi, Iregi, Maina (Ngotho), Mwangi. Gakaara wa Wanjaũ's list reads Tene, Nema Thĩ, Kariraũ, Aagu, Tiru, Cuma, Ciira, Ndemi, Mathathi, Iregi, Maina, Mwangi, Irũngũ, Mwangi wa Mandũti. The last two generations came after 1900. One of the earliest recorded lists by McGregor reads (list taken from a history of unchanged) Manjiri, Mandũti, Chiera, Masai, Mathathi, Ndemi, Iregi, Maina, Mwangi, Mũirũngũ. According to Hobley (a historian) each initiation generation, riika, extended over two years. The ruling generation at the arrival of the Europeans was called Maina. It is said that Maina handed over to Mwangi in 1898. Hobley asserts that the following sets were grouped under Maina – Kĩnũthia, Karanja, Njũgũna, Kĩnyanjui, Gathuru and Ng'ang'a. Professor Mũriũki however puts these sets much earlier, namely Karanja and Kĩnũthia belong to the Ciira ruling generation which ruled from the year 1722 to 1756, give or take 25 years, according to Mũriũki. Njũgũna, Kĩnyanjui, Ng'ang'a belong to the Mathathi ruling generation that ruled from 1757 to 1791, give or take 20 years, according to Mũriũki.

Professor Mũriũki's list must be given precedence in this area as he conducted extensive research in this area starting 1969, and had the benefit of all earlier literature on the subject as well as doing extensive field work in the areas of Gaki (Nyeri), Metumi (Mũrang'a) and Kabete (Kĩambu). On top of the ruling generations, he also gives names of the regiments or army sets from 1659 [within a margin of error] and the names of annual initiation sets beginning 1864. The list from Metumi (Mũrang'a) is most complete and differentiated.

Mũriũki's is also the most systematically defined list so far. Most of the most popular male names in Gĩkũyũ land were names of riikas (initiation sets). Here is Mũriũki's list of the names of regiment sets in Metumi (Mũrang'a): Kiariĩ (1665–1673), Cege (1678–1678), Kamau (1704–1712), Kĩmani (1717–1725), Karanja (1730–1738), Kĩnũthia (1743–1751), Njũgũna (1756–1764), Kĩnyanjui (1769–1777), Ng'ang'a (1781–1789), Njoroge (1794–1802), Wainaina (1807–1815), Kang'ethe (1820–1828), Mbũgua (1859–1867), Njenga or Mbĩra Itimũ (1872–1880), Mũtũng'ũ or Mbũrũ (1885–1893).

H.E. Lambert, who dealt with the riikas extensively, has the following list of regiment sets from Gichũgũ and Ndia. (It should be remembered that this names were unlike ruling generations not uniform in Gĩkũyũ land. It should also be noted that Ndia and Gachũgũ followed a system where initiation took place every annually for four years and then a period of nine calendar years followed where no initiation of boys took place. This period was referred to as mũhingo.) Karanja (1759–1762), Kĩnũthia (1772–1775), Ndũrĩrĩ (1785–1788), Mũgacho (1798–1801), Njoroge (1811–1814), Kang'ethe (1824–1827), Gitaũ (1837–1840), Manyaki (1850–1853), Kiambũthi (1863–1866), Watuke (1876–1879), Ngũgĩ (1889–1892), Wakanene (1902–1905).

The remarkable thing in this list in comparison to the Metumi one is how some of the same names are used, if a bit offset. Ndia and Gachũgũ are extremely far from Metumi. Gaki on the other hand, as far as my geographical understanding of Gĩkũyũ land is concerned should be much closer to Metumi, yet virtually no names of regiment sets are shared. It should however be noted that Gaki had a strong connection to the Maasai living nearby.

The ruling generation names of Maina and Mwangi are also very popular male Gĩkũyũ names. The theory is also that Waciira is also derived from ciira (case), which is also a very popular masculine name among the Agĩkũyũ. This would call into question, when it was exactly that children started being named after the parents of one's parents. Had that system, of naming one's children after one's parents been there from the beginning, there would be very few male names in circulation. This is however not the case, as there are very many Gĩkũyũ male names. One theory is that the female names are much less, with the names of the full-nine daughters of Mũmbi being most prevalent.

Gakaara wa Wanjaũ supports this view when he writes in his book, Mĩhĩrĩga ya Aagĩkũyũ,

Hingo ĩyo ciana cia arũme ciatuagwo marĩĩtwa ma mariika ta Watene, Cuma, Iregi kana Ciira. Nao airĩĩtu magatuuo marĩĩtwa ma mĩhĩrĩga tauria hagwetetwo nah au kabere, o nginya hingo iria maundu maatabariirwo thuuthaini ati ciana ituagwo aciari a mwanake na a muirĩĩtu.

Freely translated it means "In those days the male children were given the names of the riika (initiation set) like Watene, Cuma, Iregi, or Ciira. Girls were on the other hand named after the clans that were named earlier until such a time as it was decided to name the children after the parents of the man and the woman." From this statement it is not clear whether the girls were named ad hoc after any clan, no matter what clan the parents belonged to. Naming them after the specific clan that the parents belonged to would have severely restricted naming options.

This would strangely mean that the female names are the oldest in Gĩkũyũ land, further confirming its matrilineal descent. As far as male names are concerned, there is of course the chicken and the egg question, of when a name specifically appeared but some names are tied to events that happened during the initiation. For example, Wainaina refers to those who shivered during circumcision. Kũinaina (to shake or to shiver).

There was a very important ceremony known as Ituĩka in which the old guard would hand over the reins of government to the next generation. This was to avoid dictatorship. Kenyatta related how once, in the land of the Agĩkũyũ, there ruled a despotic King called Gĩkũyũ, grandson of the elder daughter (Wanjirũ according to Leakey) of the original Gĩkũyũ of Gĩkũyũ and Mũmbi fame. After he was deposed, it was decided that the government should be democratic, which is how the Ituĩka came to be. This legend of course calls into question exactly when it was that the matrilineal rule set in. The last Ituĩka ceremony, where the riika of Maina handed over power to the Mwangi generation, took place in 1898-9. The next one was supposed to be held in 1925–1928 [Kenyatta] but was thwarted by the colonial imperialist government and one by one Gĩkũyũ institutions crumbled.

Collapse of traditional political structure
The ruling generations, the rĩĩka system can be traced back to the year 1500 AD or thereabouts. These were:
 Manjiri 1512 to 1546
 Mamba 1547 to 1581
 Tene 1582 to 1616
 Agu 1617 to 1652
 Manduti 1652 to 1686
 Cuma 1687 to 1721
 Ciira 1722 to 1756
 Mathathi 1757 to 1791
 Ndemi 1792 to 1826
 Iregi 1827 to 1861
 Maina 1862 to 1897
 Mwangi 1898

The last Ituĩka ceremony where the rĩĩka of Maina handed over power to the Mwangi generation, took place in 1898–1899. The next one was supposed to be held in 1925–1928 but was thwarted by the colonial government. The traditional symbols of power among the Agikuyu nation is the Muthĩgi (Stick) which signifies power to lead and the Itimũ (Spear) signifying power to call people to war.

1888–1945

The traditional way of life of Agikuyu was disrupted when they came into contact with the British around 1888. British explorers had visited the region prior the "Scramble for Africa", and now various individuals moved to establish a colony in the region, noting the abundant and fertile farmland. Although initially non-hostile, relationships between the Agikuyu and the Europeans soon turned violent: Waiyaki Wa Hinga, a leader of the southern Agikuyu, who ruled Dagoretti who had signed a treaty with Frederick Lugard of the British East Africa Company (BEAC) burned down Lugard's fort in 1890. Waiyaki was captured two years later by the company and buried alive in revenge.

Following severe financial difficulties of the British East Africa Company, the British government on 1 July 1895 established direct Crown rule through the East African Protectorate, subsequently opening in 1902 the fertile highlands to European emigrants. The Agikuyu, upset at the waves of emigrants, enforced a policy of killing any of their own that collaborated with the colonial government. When disputes with white settlers and the Agikuyu became violent (usually over land issues), the settlers would employ Maasai tribesmen together with some colonial troops to carry out their fighting for them. The Maasai had historically negative relations with the Agikuyu, and thus were willing to take up arms against them. The various conflicts between the settlers and the Agikuyu often resulted in defeat for the latter, thanks to their inferior weaponry. The Agikuyu, having been unsuccessful in their conflicts with the European settlers and the colonial government, turned to political means as a method of resolving their grievances.

Kenya served as a base for the British in the First World War as part of their effort to capture the German colonies to the south, which were initially frustrated. At the outbreak of war in August 1914, the governors of British East Africa (as the Protectorate was generally known) and German East Africa agreed to a truce in an attempt to keep the young colonies out of direct hostilities. However, Lt. Col Paul von Lettow-Vorbeck took command of the German military forces, determined to tie down as many British resources as possible. Completely cut off from Germany, von Lettow conducted an effective guerrilla warfare campaign, living off the land, capturing British supplies, and remaining undefeated. He eventually surrendered in Zambia eleven days after the Armistice was signed in 1918. To chase von Lettow-Vorbeck, the British deployed Indian Army troops from India and then needed large numbers of porters to overcome the formidable logistics of transporting supplies far into the interior by foot. The Carrier Corps was formed and ultimately mobilised over 400,000 Africans, contributing to their long-term politicisation.

The experiences gained by Africans in the war, coupled with the creation of the white-dominated Kenya Crown Colony, gave rise to considerable political activity in the 1920s which culminated in Archdeacon Owen's "Piny Owacho" (Voice of the People) movement and the "Young Kikuyu Association" (renamed the "East African Association") started in 1921 by Harry Thuku (1895–1970), which gave a sense of nationalism to many Kikuyu and advocated civil disobedience. Thuku's campaign against the colonial government was short-lived. He was exiled to Kismayu the following year, and it was not until 1924 that the Kikuyu Central Association (KCA) was formed to carry on with Thuku's campaign. From 1924, the Kikuyu Central Association (KCA), with Jomo Kenyatta as its Secretary General focused on unifying the Kikuyu into one geographic polity, but its project was undermined by controversies over ritual tribute, land allocation, the ban on female circumcision, and support for Thuku. The KCA sent Kenyatta to England in 1924 and again in 1931 to air their grievances against the colonial government and its policies.

By the 1930s, approximately 30,000 white settlers lived in Agikuyu country and gained a political voice because of their contribution to the market economy. The area was already home to over a million members of the Kikuyu nation, most of whom had been pushed off their land by the encroaching European settlers, and lived as itinerant farmers. To protect their interests, the settlers banned the production of coffee, introduced a hut tax, and landless workers were granted less and less land in exchange for their labour. A massive exodus to the cities ensued as their ability to provide a living from the land dwindled.

In the Second World War (1939–45) Kenya became an important military base. For the Agikuyu soldiers who took part in the war as part of the King's African Rifles (KAR), the war stimulated African nationalism and shattered their conceptions of Europeans. Meanwhile, on the political front, in 1944 Thuku founded and was first chairman of the multi-ethnic Kenya African Study Union (KASU).

1945–1963

In 1946 KASU became the Kenya African Union (KAU). It was a nationalist organisation that demanded access to white-owned land. KAU acted as a constituency association for the first black member of Kenya's legislative council, Eliud Mathu, who had been nominated in 1944 by the governor after consulting with the local Bantu/Nilotic elite. The KAU remained dominated by the Kikuyu ethnic group. In 1947 Jomo Kenyatta, the former president of the moderate Kikuyu Central Association, became president of the more aggressive KAU to demand a greater political voice for the native inhabitants. The failure of the KAU to attain any significant reforms or redress of grievances from the colonial authorities shifted the political initiative to younger and more militant figures within the African trade union movement, among the squatters on the settler estates in the Rift Valley and in KAU branches in Nairobi and the Kikuyu districts of central province.

By 1952, under Field Marshal Dedan Kimathi, the Kenya Land and Freedom Army (Mau Mau) launched an all-out revolt against the colonial government,  the settlers and their Kenyan allies. By this time, the Mau Mau were fighting for complete independence of Kenya. The war is considered by some the gravest crisis of Britain's African colonies The capture of rebel leader Dedan Kimathi on 21 October 1956 signalled the ultimate defeat of the Mau Mau Uprising, and essentially ended the military campaign although the state of emergency would last until 1959. The conflict arguably set the stage for Kenyan independence in December 1963.

1963–present

Since the proclamation of the Republic of Kenya, after colonial rule in Kenya came to an end in 1963, the Agikuyu now form an integral part of the Kenyan nation. They continue to play their part as citizens of Kenya, helping to build their country. However, some Kenyans resent their incorrectly perceived superior economic status, a resentment sometimes vented through political violence, as happened in 1992, 1997 and 2007 Kenyan elections.

Genetics
According to a Y-Chromosome DNA study by Wood et al. (2005), around 73% of Gĩkũyũs belong to the common paternal haplogroup E1b1a. The remainder carry other clades: 19% E1b1b with E-M293 contributing 11%, 2% A, and 2% B.

In terms of maternal lineages, Gĩkũyũs closely cluster with other Northeast Bantu speaking groups like the Sukuma. Most belong to various Africa-centered mtDNA macro-haplogroup L lineages such as L0f, L3x, L4g and L5 per Castrì et al. (2009). According to Salas et al. (2002), other Gĩkũyũs largely carry the L1a clade, which is one of the African mtDNA Haplogroups.

Culture

Language
Gĩkũyũs speak the Gĩkũyũ language as their native tongue, which is a member of the Bantu language family. Additionally, many speak Swahili and English as lingua franca, the two official languages of Kenya.

The Gĩkũyũ are closely related to some Bantu communities due to intermarriages prior to colonization. These communities are the Embu, Meru, and Akamba people who also live around Mt. Kenya. Members of the Gĩkũyũ family from the greater Kiambu (commonly referred to as the Kabete) and Nyeri districts are closely related to the Maasai people also due to intermarriage prior to colonization. The Gĩkũyũ people between Thika and Mbeere are closely related to the Kamba people who speak a language similar to Gĩkũyũ. As a result, the Gĩkũyũ people that retain much of the original Gĩkũyũ heritage reside around Kirinyaga and Murang'a regions of Kenya. The Murang'a district is considered by many to be the cradle of the Gĩkũyũ people and as such, Gĩkũyũ's from the Murang'a area are considered to be of a purer breed.

Literature
Until 1888, the Agikuyu literature was purely expressed in folklore. Famous stories include The Maiden Who Was Sacrificed By Her Kin, The Lost Sister, The Four Young Warriors, The Girl who Cut the Hair of the N'jenge, and many more.

When the European missionaries arrived in the Agikuyu country in 1888, they learned the Kikuyu language and started writing it using a modified Roman alphabet. The Kikuyu responded strongly to missionaries and European education. They had greater access to education and opportunities for involvement in the new money economy and political changes in their country. As a consequence, there are notable Kikuyu literature icons such as Ngũgĩ wa Thiong'o and Meja Mwangi. Ngũgĩ wa Thiong'o's literary works include Caitani Mutharabaini (1981), Matigari (1986) and Murogi wa Kagogo (Wizard of the Crow (2006)) which is the largest known Kikuyu language novel having been translated into more than thirty languages.

Music
Traditional Kikuyu music has existed for generations up to 1888, when colonialism disrupted their life. Before 1888 and well into the 1920s, Kikuyu music included Kibaata, Nduumo and Muthunguci. Cultural loss increased as urbanization and modernization impacted on indigenous knowledge, including the ability to play the mũtũrĩrũ – an oblique bark flute. Today, music and dance are strong components of Kikuyu culture. There is a vigorous Kikuyu recording industry, for both secular and gospel music, in their pentatonic scale and western music styles such as "Mathwiti Maigi Ngai!".

Cinema
Kikuyu cinema and film production are a very recent phenomenon among the Agikuyu. They have become popular only in the 21st century. In the 20th century, most of the Agikuyu consumed cinema and film produced in the west. Popular Kikuyu film productions include comedies such as Machang'i series and Kihenjo series. Recently, Kenyan television channels have increased greatly and there are channels that broadcast programs in the Kikuyu language.

Cuisine
Typical Agĩkũyũ food includes Yams, sweet potatoes, Gītheri (maize and beans, after corn was introduced to Africa), Mūkimo (mashed green peas and potatoes), Kīmitū (mashed beans and potatoes), Irio (mashed dry beans, corn and potatoes), Mūtura (sausage made using goat intestines, meat and blood), Ūcūrū (fermented porridge made from flour of corn, millet or sorghum) roast goat, beef, chicken and cooked green vegetables such as collards, spinach and carrots.

Religion
Although Gĩkũyũs historically adhered to indigenous faiths, most are Christians today, of varying denominations, as well as various syncretic forms of Christianity. A third of the Kikuyu practice Islam, notably through Arab, Indian and Persian missionaries since trade with the rest of East Africa. 

A small group of Kĩkũyũ, numbering about 60 people in 2015, practice Judaism in the town of Kusuku. While they practice a normative form of Judaism (similar to Conservative Judaism), they are not a recognized part of any larger Jewish group.

Religious and cultural discord 
In April 2018, the Presbyterian Church of East Africa made a resolution to prohibit its members from the Kikuyu cultural rite known as Mburi cia Kiama and this triggered disturbances among devotees in the region of Mount Kenya. The Mburi cia Kiama entails the slaughtering of goats and advising men on how to become respected elders. When this process is over, they join different kiamas (groups). It is in these groups that they are given advice on issues like marriage, the Kikuyu culture and community responsibilities. Members of the church were given the ultimatum to renounce the cultural practice or to leave the church's fold.

List of notable Agikĩkũyũ and people of Gĩkũyũ descent

Activism, authorship, academics and science

 Wangari Maathai, Nobel Laureate, first African woman and first environmentalist to receive the Nobel Peace Prize. First Kenyan woman to earn a Ph.D.
 Ngũgĩ wa Thiong'o, Gikuyu-language author, father of author and professor Mũkoma wa Ngũgĩ
 Wanjiku Kabira, literature professor and gender rights activist
 Maina wa Kinyatti, historian and one of the foremost researchers on the Mau Mau
 Micere Githae Mugo, author, activist, literary critic and professor of literature at Syracuse University
 Wanjiru Kihoro, economist, feminist and political activist
 Njoki Wainaina, founder and first executive director of the African Women's Development and Communication Network (FEMNET)
 Wangui wa Goro, academic and social critic
 Joseph Maina Mungai, pioneer medical researcher in East Africa
 Ng'endo Mwangi, Kenya's first woman physician. The Mwangi Cultural Center at the Smith College in Massachusetts is named in her honor
 Carole Wamuyu Wainaina, Assistant Secretary-General for Human Resources Management at the United Nations
 Helen Gichohi, ecologist and President of the African Wildlife Foundation
 Olive Mugenda, first woman to head a public university in the African Great Lakes region
 Florence Wambugu, plant pathologist and virologist
 Thumbi Ndung'u, HIV/AIDS researcher and the first to clone HIV subtype C. Recipient of the Howard Hughes Medical Institute's International Early Career Scientist award 
 Dorothy Wanja Nyingi, ichthyologist and recipient of the Ordre des Palmes académiques (Order of Academic Palms)
 Kimani Maruge, oldest person in the world to start primary school after enrolling in first grade aged 84
 David Muchoki Kanja, the first Assistant Secretary-General for the Office of Internal Oversight Services at the United Nations
 Muthoni Wanyeki, political scientist and human rights activist
 Simon Gikandi, English professor at Princeton University
 Gibson Kamau Kuria, lawyer and recipient of the Robert F. Kennedy Human Rights Award
 Paul Muite, lawyer, politician, multiparty activist and former presidential candidate
 Judy Thongori, lawyer and women's rights activist
 Maina Kiai, lawyer, human rights activist and United Nations Special Rapporteur on the rights to freedom of peaceful assembly and of association
 Michael Ndurumo, deaf educator and the third deaf person from Africa to obtain a Ph.D.
 Ngugi wa Mirii, playwright
 Koigi wa Wamwere, author, politician and human rights activist
 Meja Mwangi, author
 Rebeka Njau, author and playwright. Her one-act play The Scar (1965), which condemns female genital mutilation, is considered the first play written by a Kenyan woman. 

 Boniface Mwangi, photojournalist and sociopolitical activist
 Ann Njogu, human rights and constitutional reform activist

 John Githongo, anti-corruption activist
 Gitura Mwaura, author, poet

Arts and media

 Wangechi Mutu, artist and sculptor
 Ingrid Mwangi, Kenyan-German artist
 Wanuri Kahiu, film director
 Wahome Mutahi, humorist popularly known as Whispers after satirical column he wrote
 Jeff Koinange, Emmy Award-winning journalist
 Julie Gichuru, news anchor and entrepreneur 
 Liza Mũcherũ-Wisner, a semi-finalist in The Apprentice Season 10
 Edi Gathegi, stage, film and television actor
 Tom Morello, Grammy Award-winning guitarist, son of Ngethe Njoroge
 Eric Wainana, musician
 Janet Mbugua, news anchor
 David Mathenge, musician popularly known as "Nameless"
 Stella Mwangi, Kenyan-Norwegian musician known by the stage name STL. Represented Norway in Eurovision Song Contest 2011
 Wahu, musician
 Avril, musician and actress
 Amani, musician
 Jaguar, musician
 Joseph Kamaru, musician
 Daniel Kamau Mwai "DK", musician
 Queen Jane, musician
 Abbas Kubaff, hip hop artist
 Wangechi, rapper
 Victoria Kimani, musician and actress
 Patricia Kihoro, musician, actress and radio personality
 Size 8, musician and actress (mother: Esther Njeri Munyali (Kikuyu), father: Samuel Kirui Munyali (Ugandan from Mbale))
 Mustafa Olpak, Writer, Turkish Human rights activist descended from Kikuyu slaves in Crete

Business and economics

 Patrick Ngugi Njoroge, Governor of the Central Bank of Kenya
 Njuguna Ndung'u, economics professor and former Governor of the Central Bank of Kenya
 Samuel Kamau Macharia, founder and chairman of Royal Media Services, the largest private radio and television network in Eastern Africa
 Philip Ndegwa, entrepreneur, internationally respected economist and former Governor of the Central Bank of Kenya
 Peter Munga, founder and chairman of Equity Group Holdings Limited, Eastern Africa's second largest bank by customers after C.B.E.
 James Mwangi, group CEO and largest individual shareholder at Equity Group Holdings Limited
 Eunice Njambi Mathu, founder and editor-in-chief of Parents Africa Magazine
 Nelson Muguku Njoroge, entrepreneur
 Pius Ngugi Mbugua, entrepreneur and owner of the Kenya Nut Company, one of the world's largest macadamia nut exporters
 Chris Kirubi, industrialist and largest individual shareholder at Centum Investment Company Limited, the largest listed private equity firm in East Africa
 Jane Wanjiru Michuki, lawyer and investor
 Duncan Nderitu Ndegwa, former Governor of the Central Bank of Kenya
 Betty Muthoni Gikonyo, co-founder and group CEO at Karen Hospital
 Simon Gicharu, founder of Mount Kenya University, East and Central Africa's largest private university
 Tabitha Karanja, founder and CEO of Keroche Breweries, Kenya's second-largest brewery
 Gerishon Kamau Kirima, real estate magnate
 Eddah Waceke Gachukia, educationist, entrepreneur and co-founder of Riara Group of Schools
 Esther Muthoni Passaris, businesswoman and politician
 Wanjiku Mugane, businesswoman and investment banker. Co-founder of First Africa Group which was later bought by Standard Chartered
 Dorcas Muthoni, an inductee to the Internet Hall of Fame 
 Benson Wairegi, group CEO at Britam Holdings plc
 John Gachora, group CEO at NIC Bank Group
 Wilfred Kiboro, chairman of the Board of Directors at Nation Media Group, East Africa's largest media house. Former group CEO
 Mugo Kibati, group CEO of Sanlam Kenya Plc and chairman of Lake Turkana Wind Power 
 Joseph Mucheru, former Google Sub-Saharan Africa Lead and current Cabinet Secretary for ICT in Kenya
 Dominic Kiarie, former group CEO, UAP Holdings

Politics, military and resistance

 Rigathi Gachagua deputy President of Kenya as from September 2022
 Johnson Gicheru, former Chief Justice of Kenya
 Stanley Munga Githunguri, politician and businessman
 Waiyaki wa Hinga, 19th century leader
 Waruhiu Itote also known as General China. Mau Mau resistance leader
 Bildad Kaggia, freedom-fighter and politician. Member of the Mau Mau Central Committee and the Kapenguria Six
 Mutahi Kagwe, politician
 Julius Waweru Karangi, retired General and former Chief of the Kenya Defence Forces
 Josephat Karanja, former Vice-President
 Godfrey Gitahi Kariuki, politician
 Josiah Mwangi Kariuki, businessman and socialist politician 
 Muthui Kariuki, former spokesman for the Government of Kenya
 Martha Wangari Karua, politician and former presidential candidate
 Lucy Muringo Gichuhi, first person of Black African descent to be elected to the Australian Parliament
 Kung'u Karumba, freedom-fighter and member of the Kapenguria Six 
 Njenga Karume, politician and businessman
 Peter Kenneth, politician, businessman and former presidential candidate
 Jomo Kenyatta, first President of Kenya, father of Uhuru Kenyatta
 Margaret Kenyatta, fourth First Lady of Kenya, wife of Uhuru Kenyatta
 Uhuru Kenyatta, fourth President of Kenya, former Deputy Prime Minister
 Ngina Kenyatta (Mama Ngina), former First Lady, wife of Jomo Kenyatta, mother of Uhuru Kenyatta
 Lucy Kibaki, former First Lady, wife of Mwai Kibaki
 Mwai Kibaki, third President of Kenya
 Dedan Kimathi, Mau Mau resistance leader 
 Mbiyu Koinange, former Minister of State, brother-in-law of Jomo Kenyatta, first Kenyan holder of a master's degree
 Moses Kuria, Member of parliament, Gatundu South.
 Arthur Magugu, politician
 Wangu wa Makeri, female chief leader
 Eliud Mathu, first African member of the Kenyan Legislative Council (LegCo)
 Kenneth Matiba, businessman, politician, multiparty activist and former presidential candidate
 John Njoroge Michuki, politician and businessman
 Githu Muigai, Attorney General
 Njoroge Mungai, politician and businessman. Personal doctor and first cousin to Jomo Kenyatta
 Chris Murungaru, politician
 John Michael Njenga Mututho, politician and anti-alcohol abuse campaigner
 David Mwiraria, former finance minister and member of parliament
 Njoki Susanna Ndung'u, Judge of the Supreme Court of Kenya
 Charles Njonjo, former Attorney General and Minister for Constitutional Affairs
 Wambui Otieno, freedom fighter and the principal protagonist in landmark burial case
 Charles Rubia, former member of parliament and multiparty political activist
 George Saitoti, former Vice-President
 Harry Thuku, freedom-fighter and Independence Hero
 Anne Waiguru, former Cabinet Secretary for Devolution and Planning
 Gakaara wa Wanjaũ, freedom fighter, author and historian

Religion

 Mugo wa Kibiru, 19th century traditional healer and seer
 Manasses Kuria, second African Anglican Archbishop. See biography
 John Njenga, Archbishop of the Roman Catholic Church
 Judy Mbugua, chair of the Pan African Christian Women Alliance (PACWA)
 Dr. David Gitari, third Archbishop and Primate of the Anglican Church of Kenya
 Margaret Wanjiru, Evangelical Bishop

Sports

 Samuel Wanjiru, first Kenyan to win the Olympic gold medal in the marathon, 2008 Beijing Olympic Marathon Champion, 2009 London and New York Marathon Champion, 2009 Rotterdam Half Marathon champion
 John Ngugi, World Cross Country Champion four consecutive titles between 1986 and 1989 and five titles overall. 1988 Olympic Champion 5000 metres
 Catherine Ndereba, four-time Boston Marathon Champion, Olympic marathon silver medalist in 2004 and 2008.
 Henry Wanyoike, Paralympics Gold medalist over 5,000 meters, holder of various marathon and half marathon records
 Douglas Wakiihuri, 1987 World Championships in Athletics Marathon Champion, 1988 Olympic Marathon silver medalist, 1990 London and New York Marathon Champion
 Patrick Njiru, rally driver with Subaru World Rally Team
 Joseph Gikonyo, 100 and 200 metres sprints gold medalist at 1990 African Championships.
 Boniface Tumuti, 400 metres hurdles gold medalist at the 2016 African Championships, silver medalist at the 2016 Olympics.
 QueenArrow, esports player, first woman in East Africa to be signed by a professional esports organisation
 Cliff Nyakeya, footballer who is an attacking midfielder/winger for Egyptian club ZED FC and the Kenya national team

References

Sources

Further reading
 
 Elkins, Caroline, 2005. Imperial Reckoning: The Untold Story of Britain's Gulag in Kenya.  (Henry Holt)
 Huxley, Elspeth. 2006. Red Strangers. (Penguin)
Kanogo, Tabitha.1987. Squatters and the Roots of Mau Mau. (J Currey Press)
 Lonsdale, John, and Berman, Bruce. 1992. Unhappy Valley: Conflict in Kenya and Africa. (J Currey Press)
 Lonsdale, John, and Atieno Odhiambo, E. S. (eds.) 2003.  Mau Mau and Nationhood: Arms, Authority and Narration. (J. Currey Press)
 Muhindi, Samuel, Author [Ngucanio 1 & 2] 2009, A Gĩkũyũ Christian movie] - The first Gĩkũyũ author to write and shoot a Christian Gĩkũyũ movie
 Mwakikagile, Godfrey, Kenya: Identity of A Nation.  Pretoria, South Africa: New Africa Press, 2008.
 Mwakikagile, Godfrey. Ethnic Politics in Kenya and Nigeria. Huntington, New York: Nova Science Publishers, 2001.
 Wanjaũ, Gakaara Wa, 1988. Mau Mau Author in Detention. Translated by Paul Ngigi Njoroge. (Heinemann Kenya Limited)
 Emmanuel Kariũki, Kikuyu People Secrets of the migration from Egypt to Mount Kenya at hubpages.com, 2012

External links

Kikuyu People - World History Encyclopedia
 Kayû ka muingi Kameme FM Listen Live
 Gĩkũyũ.com
 Muigwithania 2.0 – First Gĩkũyũ Newspaper – The original KCA publication banned by the colonial government revived on the Internet in 2008